Trinity Lutheran Church is a historic Lutheran church at 6th and Washington Streets in Reading, Berks County, Pennsylvania.  The current church building was built in 1791, and is a two-story, three bays by five-bays, red brick building with stone and wood trim in the Georgian style. The second floor was added in 1851.  It has a square bell tower and steeple last replaced in 1963.  The front facade features a columned portico added in 1900.

It was listed on the National Register of Historic Places in 1976.

Trinity remains an active presence in the Reading community.  The current senior pastor is Alan Wolkenhauer.

References

Buildings and structures in Reading, Pennsylvania
Churches on the National Register of Historic Places in Pennsylvania
Georgian architecture in Pennsylvania
Lutheran churches in Pennsylvania
Churches in Berks County, Pennsylvania
Tourist attractions in Reading, Pennsylvania
National Register of Historic Places in Reading, Pennsylvania